Amiantofusus cartilago is a species of sea snail, a marine gastropod mollusc in the family Fasciolariidae, the spindle snails, the tulip snails and their allies.

Description

Distribution
This species is found in the Mozambique Channel, an arm of the Indian Ocean located between Madagascar and Mozambique.

References

External links
  Fraussen K., Kantor Y. & Hadorn R. 2007. Amiantofusus gen. nov. for Fusus amiantus Dall, 1889 (Mollusca: Gastropoda: Fasciolariidae) with description of a new and extensive Indo-West Pacific radiation. Novapex 8 (3–4): 79–101

Fasciolariidae
Gastropods described in 2007